"Dates" is the seventh Christmas special episode of the BBC sitcom, Only Fools and Horses, first broadcast on 25 December 1988. In the episode, Del Boy joins a dating agency and meets Raquel. Rodney also goes on a date, with Nag's Head barmaid Nerys.

Synopsis
The Trotters have been earning a lot of money recently, and Uncle Albert's birthday is upcoming, which Del Boy and Rodney pretend to have forgotten. Meanwhile, after seeing a girl Trigger has met through a local dating agency, Del also decides to sign up. Styling himself "Derek Duvall", managing director of a successful import and export business, he meets a struggling actress named Raquel Turner. The two form a bond and agree to meet again. Del asks Raquel to join him at Albert's birthday party, but she declines, saying she has to attend an acting class.

Rodney also arranges a date, with Nag's Head barmaid, "Nervous" Nerys. He is convinced by Mickey and Jevon that Nerys likes "macho" men. Wearing a leather jacket and acting aloof, he goes driving with Nerys. They are followed by a gang of punks, which leads to a high-speed car chase. They race past two police officers at temporary traffic signals. The officers vow to apprehend the driver of the 'yellow, three-wheeled van'.

As a surprise for Albert's party, Del has hired a stripper, who turns out to be Raquel. The two recognise each other and, hurt, Del storms out of the pub before telling Raquel he no longer wants to see her but soon regrets his actions. Raquel tells him that she has received an offer to work in the Middle East, and that if he wants her to stay, he should visit her before the flight leaves. Del plans to meet her, but while at the Nag's Head he is approached by the two police officers still looking for the owner of the yellow van. Believing the female officer to be another stripper hired by Albert as a joke, Del rips her blouse off and is arrested. Dispirited, Raquel leaves for the Middle East just as Del Boy is taken into custody.

Episode cast

First appearances
Tessa Peake-Jones as Raquel Turner

External links

1988 British television episodes
British Christmas television episodes
Only Fools and Horses special episodes